From the Life of a Chief of the Criminal Police is a 1983 Soviet drama film directed by Stepan Puchinyan.

Plot 
The film tells about the difficult relationship between the head of the criminal investigation department and the thief, which change with the emergence of a critical situation.

Cast 
 Kirill Lavrov as Col. Malych Ivan Konstantinovich
 Leonid Filatov as Stepan Petrovich Slepnyov
 Elena Proklova as Natalia Petrovna Slepnyova
 Natalia Gontuar as Anechka Slepnyova (as Natasha Gontuar)
 Aleksandr Prodan as Kolya Slepnyov (as Sasha Prodan)
 Natalya Fateeva as Teacher
 Leonid Kharitonov as Grandfather
 Igor Livanov as Volodya Panteleev
 Yuriy Chernov as Gangster Koryto
 Aleksandr Pashutin as Driver Utkin

References

External links 
 

1983 films
1980s Russian-language films
Soviet drama films
1983 drama films